Giuliana Attenni was an Italian film editor. She worked on dozens of films between 1947 and 1973, and frequently worked with directors like Mariano Laurenti, Mario Mattoli, and Stefano Vanzina.

Selected filmography 
 Il figlioccio del padrino (1973)
 Quel gran pezzo della Ubalda tutta nuda e tutta calda (1972)
 Naughty Nun (1972)
 I due assi del guantone (1971)
 Ma che musica maestro (1971)
 I due maghi del pallone (1970)
 Have a Good Funeral, My Friend... Sartana Will Pay (1970)
 Satiricosissimo (1970)
 Zingara (1969)
 The Nephews of Zorro (1968)
 I barbieri di Sicilia (1967)
 I due sanculotti (1966)
 Love Italian Style (1966)
 Two Sons of Ringo (1966)
 Il vostro super agente Flit (1966)
 I grandi condottieri (1965)
 Letti sbagliati (1965)
 Un mostro e mezzo (1964)
 Heroes of the West (1964)
 The Four Musketeers (1963)
 Kali Yug, la dea della vendetta (1963)
 Toto vs. the Four (1963)
 Two Colonels (1963)
 The Four Monks (1962)
 Lo smemorato di Collegno (1962)
 Psycosissimo (1962)
 Totò diabolicus (1962)
 Seduction of the South (1961)
 A noi piace freddo...! (1961)
 ...And Suddenly It's Murder! (1960)
 Via Margutta (1960)
 Letto a tre piazze (1960)
 Toto in Madrid (1959)
 First Love (1959)
 Totò nella luna (1958)
 Susanna tutta panna (1957)
 Nero's Mistress (1956)
 The Awakening (1956)
 Piccola posta (1955)
 Torpedo Zone (1955)
 Sins of Casanova (1955)
 An American in Rome (1954)
 A Day in Court (1954)
 Modern Virgin (1954)
 Vestire gli ignudi (1954)
 Siamo tutti inquilini (1953)
 Brothers of Italy (1952)
 Toto the Third Man (1951)
 Accidents to the Taxes!! (1951)
 Arrivano i nostri (1951)
 The Steamship Owner (1951)
 47 morto che parla (1950)
 Totò sceicco (1950)
 The Cadets of Gascony (1950)
 Side Street Story (1950)
The Elusive Twelve (1950)
 The Merry Widower (1950)
 Signorinella (1949)
 Adam and Eve (1949)
 The Firemen of Viggiu (1949)
 Totò al giro d'Italia (1948)
 Fifa e arena (1948)
 Flesh Will Surrender (1947)

References 

Italian film editors
Italian women film editors